Ažytėnai (formerly) is a village in Kėdainiai district municipality, in Kaunas County, in central Lithuania. According to the 2011 census, the village had a population of 239 people. There are library, school, medicine station, agriculture cooperative.

Ažytėnai is famous for being a living place of Lithuanian writer, agronomist Mikalojus Katkus (1852–1944). His house now is a memorial museum.

History
On 1 April 1863 a big battle of the January Uprising occurred between Ažytėnai and Lenčiai villages. About 600 insurgents, led by Bolesław Kajetan Kolyszko, Bolesław Roman Dłuski and K. Ciszkewicz had confronted Russian imperial army. In 1910 the first school was opened in Ažytėnai.

During the Soviet era, Ažytėnai was a kolkhoz center and between 1950 and 1963 a selsovet center.

Demography

Images

References

Villages in Kaunas County
Kėdainiai District Municipality